Five-time defending champions Martina Navratilova and Pam Shriver successfully defended their title, defeating Chris Evert and Wendy Turnbull in the final 6–0, 7–5 to win the women's doubles tennis title at the 1988 Australian Open.

Seeds
Champion seeds are indicated in bold text while text in italics indicates the round in which those seeds were eliminated.

Draw

Finals

Top half

Section 1

Section 2

Bottom half

Section 3

Section 4

External links
 1988 Australian Open – Women's draws and results at the International Tennis Federation

Women's Doubles
1988